The 1948 Florida gubernatorial election was held on November 2, 1948. Democratic nominee Fuller Warren defeated Republican nominee Bert L. Acker with 83.35% of the vote.

Primary elections
Primary elections were held on May 4, 1948.

Democratic primary

Candidates
Fuller Warren, former State Representative
Daniel T. McCarty, former State Representative
Colin English, Florida Superintendent of Public Instruction
William A. Shands, State Senator
J. Thomas Watson, Florida Attorney General
Richard H. Cooper
Bernarr Macfadden
F. D. Akin
Basil H. Pollitt

Results

Republican primary

Candidates
Bert L. Acker
John L. Cogdill

Results

General election

Candidates
Fuller Warren, Democratic
Bert L. Acker, Republican

Results

References

1948
Florida
Gubernatorial